Escola Secundária Luso-Chinesa de Luís Gonzaga Gomes (ESLCLGG ) is a public secondary school in São Lázaro (Saint Lazarus Parish), Macau. Named after , it was established in 1985.

The original site of the school was Macao Jiejie School(now Colegio Mateus Ricci). In 1986, it moved to the Macao School Complex (now the Macao Polytechnic University) and was named Escola Secundária e Preparatória Sino-Portuguesa de Luis Gonzaga Gomes. In 1989, the school was part of the elementary school and was renamed Escola Secundaria Luso-Chinesa de Luis Gonzaga Gomes, providing regular grammar middle school courses for junior high school to high school. In order to more effectively develop secondary education, the school moved to the current location of Avenida de Sidónio Pais, Macao, in 1995, and the school itself has continued to develop. In 2002, the school building expansion project began. Two new school buildings were built on both sides of the original main building and completed in 2003.
To provide regular grammar secondary school courses for Macao school-age children, and to cultivate trilogy and four languages (Cantonese, Mandarin, Portuguese and English).
The school is divided into Chinese and Portuguese sections.

The school has four campuses, which are:
The Chinese Department of the Day: The Chinese language is the main language of instruction, and the regular grammar middle school course of six years (Grade 7 to Grade 12).
The Portuguese Department of the day: Opened in 1998, with Portuguese as the main language of instruction, providing regular grammar secondary school courses for junior high schools(Grade 7 to Grade 9).
Secondary Adult Night School: Founded in 1999, it provides formal courses for junior high school and high school for adults who fail to complete secondary school in Macau. The unit system is the basis of the curriculum. Originally taught only at night, and opened in 2005.
Portuguese Adult Night School: Opened in 1998, the Portuguese language is the main language of instruction, providing night junior high school and high school courses.

History
In 1985, in order to continue the education of Sino-Portuguese primary and secondary schools, Former Portuguese Macau Government Education Department organized the first Sino-Portuguese Middle School, This is the predecessor of Escola Secundaria Luso Chinesa de Luis Gonzaga Gomes. 
At that time, the authorities rented the third floor of one of the teaching buildings of the St. Paul's Jiejie School. In the beginning, only four classes in the first grade of junior high school were opened. The number of students was 81 and the number of teachers was 12.

Curriculum
ESLC is a Cantonese-medium school, and the Macau government uses ESLC to test adjustments to the Macau secondary school curriculum. While most Macau private schools have English classes as the primary foreign language instruction, ESLC instead has Portuguese as its main foreign language. Circa the 1990s/2000s on a weekly basis each student takes six hours of Portuguese classes. It was the school in which a class on Macau history was introduced. In previous eras the school used curriculum and materials from Hong Kong as equivalent Macau-oriented products were not made at that time.

Student body
Circa the 1990s/2000s it had a higher percentage recent immigrants from Mainland China and low income students compared to other Macau schools.

List of Nationalities represented at ESLCLGG(Faculty and Students)

Facilities
Outdoor
Basketball Court
Multifunction Court
Teaching Building A
Classrooms
Multifunction Room
Toilets
Vending Machines
Snack Bar(before)
Band Room
Cafeteria 
Main Teaching Building
Classrooms
Meeting Rooms
Toilets
First Aids' Room
Small Auditorium
School’s Office
Principal's Room
Music Room
Library
Art Room
Teaching Building B
Classrooms
Toilets
Mini Multifunction Court
Computer Rooms
Laboratories
Mini Gym

School Song
"揚帆"

Extracurricular activities
The school has various extracurricular activities that students can join after school, including Tchoukball, Jump Rope, Basketball, Volleyball, Soccer(before), Table Tennis(before), Tennis, Choir, A cappella, Piano, Ukulele, Portuguese Folk Dance, Modern Dance, Track and Field, Digital Photography, IELTS, Debate, DIY, Painting and many many more.

Houses
Upon entering ESLCLGG, new students are divided into four houses. The four houses competes every year in the schools activity called "Four Colors Activity" which happens two times in a year. The house with the highest overall score is the champion of the school year. Through this system, the competition encourages student excitement, achievement and greater enthusiasm and school spirit. 
There are four houses to which students and teachers are randomly assigned.
Red
Green
Blue
Orange
Black(Principal and Vice Principals)

Student Council
Established in 1998, the Student Council is responsible for organising various kinds of in-school and inter-school activities. The Council consists of seven cabinet members and representatives of different student bodies, including the Prefects' Board, the Houses, the Sports Section, as well as other clubs and societies.

The Cabinet
President;
Vice-President;
Secretary for Wellness;
Secretary for Publicity;
Secretary for MC(Master of Ceremonies);
Secretary for Affairs;
Secretary for Information and Technology;

Academic performance
Circa the 1990s/2000s about 50 percent of the students who graduated matriculated to post-secondary educational institutions.

Summary of Events

2019/2020 school year
Assistant Principal Mo Peiyu and Prof.Alda Jose Rocha of the Portuguese and Chinese Department retired.
2018/2019 school year
February: Portugal Escola Secundária Carlos Amarante School and the School of Sisters Under the needle of the Macao Education and Youth Affairs Bureau, the Vice-Chancellor of the School, Ms. Yang Yushi, and the Coordinator of the Portuguese Department of the Day, Rovena Madeira, went to Portugal to attend the signing ceremony of the sister school on February 8, with Escola Secundária Carlos Amarante do Agrupamento de Escolas The Carlos Amarante School was established as a sister school. 
The main school building finished its renovation.
2017/2018 school year
The school won its first overall championship in the Inter-school Jump Rope competition, defeating 20 other schools.
2016/2017 school year
2017 Macau Open and United School Tchoukball Finals: In the men's joint school competition, the men's team A won the third place and the men's team B won the seventh place. In the women's joint school competition, the women's team A won the second place and the women's team B won the fourth place. In the women's open league, the women's team won the second place. 
The main school building started its renovation.
2015/2016 school year
2016 Macau Open and United School Tchoukball Finals: Both men's team A and women's team A respectively won second place.
April 14: Kuang Pengfeng won the championship of the 2016 Macau Open Badminton Championship, becoming the youngest champion in the history of the competition.
2014/2015 school year
February 25, 2015; 30th Anniversary of the Founding of the School
March 6: The school had its Memorial Party to celebrate its 30th Anniversary of the Founding of the School.
2013/2014 school year
The school choir achieved its first "Good" result in the Inter-school Choir competition prior to achieving "Fine" throughout the past years.
2012/2013 school year
Teacher Yu Peijun of the Chinese Department and Prof.Alice Esteves of the Portuguese Department retired in early 2013
2011/2012 school year
2010/2011 school year
Teacher Zhang Jiayi served as the training assistant coordinator
Teacher Chen Yinglun and Mr. Huang Yiheng respectively served as principals and vice principals of Escola Secundaria Luso Chinesa Tecnico Profissional.
2009/2010 school year
February 25, 2010; 25th Anniversary of the Founding of the School
The school won its first major victory in the Inter-school Soccer competition, defeating Pui Va Middle School.
2007/2008 school year
September 5, 2007: Beginning of the 07/08 school year
September 1, 2007: Repair of campus outdoor playground project begins
November 2007: Launched the "Napping Plan" to provide an afternoon nap for individual students in need
Mid-November 2007: The playground project was completed
February 29, 2008: The 100th Anniversary of Mr. Luis Gonzaga Gomes and the 2008 Cultural Day
2006/2007 school year
July 11, 2007: Mr. Luis Gonzaga Gomes's 100th birthday memorial mass
February 9, 2007: Cultural Day - Macau Food Culture
November 28, 2006: Awarded the "ICAN School Merit Award" by the Hong Kong Education for All
Cooperate with the Macao Health Bureau to implement the Healthy Campus Program
Implementing " Birth Education " in the second part of junior high school and junior high school
The ICAN Whole Person Education Program begins in the first year of junior high school and high school.
Launched the Campus Communityization Program at the school
2005/2006 school year
February 24, 2006: Cultural Day - Folk Traditional Games
February 6–10, 2006: Selection of individual students to participate in the "Flying Eagle Project"
October 1, 2005: Opening a day high school return to education course
September 2005-January 2006: Comprehensive School Assessment
September 1, 2005: Beginning of the 2005/2006 school year, the implementation of the "Students Education" in individual classes, as well as the ICAN holistic education course in the weekly class teacher class in junior high school classes
2004/2005 school year
July 2005: The first high school graduation education graduation ceremony was held
June 29, 2005: Concluded into a sister school with Huizhou Experimental High School in Guangdong Province
March 1, 2005: Celebration of the 20th Anniversary of the Founding of the University
September 1, 2004: Training Auxiliary Group was established, Teacher Chen Yinglun was appointed as Training Coordinator; Teacher Yang Yushi was appointed as Academic Coordinator
2003/2004 school year
September 1, 2003: The establishment of the Prefect Group
March 27, 2004: Inauguration Ceremony and Open Day of the New Teaching Building, two new teaching buildings officially opened
2002/2003 school year
September 1, 2002: Change of school badge and new winter/summer uniform style
September 1, 2002: Changed from a five-year secondary school to a six-year secondary school
2002: Opened a high school regression education course with Chinese as the medium of instruction, allowing people aged 18 or above to enroll
2001/2002 school year
2002: Construction of the new campus building
2000/2001 school year
February 19, 2001: The first flag-raising ceremony was held
July 31, 2001: Vice President Huang Manyun officially left office
August 1, 2001: Teacher Chen Shuhui was appointed as Vice President
September 1, 2001: Teacher Mo Peiyu was appointed as assistant to the principal
1999/2000 school year
1999: Escola Secundaria Luso Chinesa de Luis Gonzaga Gomes Prefect Group was established
1998/1999 school year
September 1, 1998: Escola Secundria Luso Chinesa Tecnico Profissional was opened, and night vocational training was taken over by the school.
September 1, 1998: Teacher Chen Shuhui was appointed as assistant to the principal
1998: Escola Secundaria Luso Chinesa de Luis Gonzaga Gomes School Student Association established
1999: According to the 1/SAAEJ/99 endorsement, a junior high school returning education course with Chinese as the medium of instruction is offered for those aged 18 or above.
1997/1998 school year
1997: Due to the large number of students and the lack of application of school buildings, the first and second floor school buildings of the Escola Primaria Luso Chinesa da Flora were used for the first year of the first grade.
1996/1997 school year
1996: Gradually implement the reform of the secondary school curriculum, from a five-year secondary school curriculum to a six-year secondary school curriculum
March 1, 1997: Teacher Liang Youcheng was appointed as the principal
May 11, 1997: Escola Secundaria Luso Chinesa de Luis Gonzaga Gomes Parents Association was established
September 1, 1997: Teacher Yu Peixian was officially appointed as Vice President
Opened night vocational courses
1995/1996 school year
Liang Li was appointed as Principal, Wong Man-yun and Leung Yu-ching as Vice-Chancellor
1994/1995 school year
Teacher Li Miaolan was appointed as Principal, Teacher Liu Weihong and Verónica Carvalho respectively as Vice President and Secretary
Moved to Avenida de Sidónio Pais (current location)
1990/1991 school year
The government issued a decree to cancel classes below secondary school. From this year onwards, the school will only have secondary education and will change its current name.
1989/1990 school year
According to Decree No. 62/89/M, Escola Secundária e Preparatória Sino-Portuguesa de Luis Gonzaga Gomes was renamed as Escola Secundaria Luso Chinesa de Luis Gonzaga Gomes and began to phase out the fifth and sixth grade courses.
1988/1989 school year
1987/1988 school year
Mr. Liang Li, a member of the School of Management, was appointed as the Chairman of the School Management Committee, Mr. Li Miaolan and Alda José Rocha as Vice Chairman and Secretary of the School Management Committee respectively.
1986/1987 school year
According to the No. 129/86/M, the Sino-Portuguese secondary education curriculum was named Escola Secundária e Preparatória Sino-Portuguesa de Luis Gonzaga Gomes. In addition to the original Sino-Portuguese secondary education curriculum, it was also included in the fifth and sixth grades of Ho Tung Primary School.
According to Decree 38/86/M, Escola Preparatória e Secundária Luso Chinesa de Luìs Gonzaga Gomes, Escola Secundária do Infante D.Henrique and Goshua Preparatory Secondary School ( Escola Preparatória do Dr. José Gomes da Silva) jointly formed the "Macau School Complex" (the school is today at the Polytechnic Institute)
Mr. Pan Jialin, a member of the School Management Committee, Mr. Liang Li and Mr. Zhang Ziming were appointed as the Vice Chairman of the School Management Committee as the Secretary of the School Management Committee.
1985/1986 school year
September 1, 1985: Formally established, with secondary school and preparatory secondary education. According to the instructions No. 30/ect/85, the Sino-Portuguese secondary education curriculum will be opened, and the first year of the Sino-Portuguese Middle School Education Course (Grade 7) will be opened. The third classroom of the third floor of the Teaching Building of the Jiejie School(Now Colegio Mateus Ricci)will be temporarily borrowed.

References

External links

 Escola Secundária Luso-Chinesa de Luís Gonzaga Gomes 
 Information 

Schools in Macau
1985 establishments in the Portuguese Empire
Educational institutions established in 1985